Water Boyy: The Series is a 2017 Thai television series adaptation of the 2015 film with the same title, Waterboyy, starring Pirapat Watthanasetsiri (Earth), Thitipoom Techaapaikhun (New), Nawat Phumphotingam (White), Charada Imraporn (Piglet), Chatchawit Techarukpong (Victor) and Sananthachat Thanapatpisal (Fon).

Directed by Rachyd Kusolkulsiri and produced by GMMTV, the series was one of the six television series for 2017 showcased by GMMTV in their "6 Natures+" event on 2 March 2017. It premiered on One31 and LINE TV on 9 April 2017, airing on Sundays at 17:00 ICT and 19:00 ICT, respectively. The series concluded on 9 July 2017.

Cast and characters 
Below are the cast of the series:

Main 
 Pirapat Watthanasetsiri (Earth) as Waii
 Thitipoom Techaapaikhun (New) as Apo
 Nawat Phumphotingam (White) as Fah
 Charada Imraporn (Piglet) as Pan
 Chatchawit Techarukpong (Victor) as Min
 Sananthachat Thanapatpisal (Fon) as Wan

Supporting 
 Weerayut Chansook (Arm) as Put
 Krittanai Arsalprakit (Nammon) as Sung
 Tanutchai Wijitwongthong (Mond) as Kluay
 Tytan Teepprasan as Achi
 Apichaya Saejung (Ciize) as Namkaeng
 Dom Hetrakul as Teer
 Jirakit Kuariyakul (Toptap) as Kan
 Phakjira Kanrattanasood (Nanan) as Mai
 Nattapat Sakullerphasuk (Fil) as George
 Sutthipha Kongnawdee (Noon) as Aom

Guest role 
 Surat Permpoonsavat (Yacht) as bully

Soundtracks

References

External links 
 Water Boyy: The Series on GMM 25 website 
 Water Boyy: The Series  on LINE TV
 

Thai romantic comedy television series
2017 Thai television series debuts
2017 Thai television series endings
Sports television series
2010s teen drama television series
Thai boys' love television series
Television series by GMMTV
Live action television shows based on films
GMM 25 original programming
2010s LGBT-related comedy television series
2010s LGBT-related drama television series